Kirkland Lake Airport  is located  northeast of Kirkland Lake, Ontario, Canada. The airport was established on December 7, 1982.

References

Airports established in 1982
Certified airports in Timiskaming District
Kirkland Lake
1982 establishments in Ontario